Swimming was one of the many sports which was held at the 1997 West Asian Games in Tehran, Iran between 22 and 24 November 1997. The competition took place at the Azadi Sport Complex. It had a men's only programme containing 16 events. A total of 35 swimmers from 6 nations (Iran, Syria, Kuwait, Kyrgyzstan, Turkmenistan and Tajikistan) participated.

Medalists

Medal table

References

Official website

External links
Olympic Council of Asia - 1997 West Asian Games

West Asian Games
1997 West Asian Games
1997 West Asian Games
1997